Sharly Mabussi (born 27 May 1997) is a Congolese professional footballer who plays as a left back for Oțelul Galați.

Early life
Mabussi was born and raised in Kinshasa, Democratic Republic of the Congo.

Club career

FC Edmonton
On 7 January 2021, Mabussi signed with Canadian Premier League side FC Edmonton. On February 9, 2022, the club announced that Mabussi and all but two other players would not be returning for the 2022 season.

Career statistics

References

External links

Living people
1997 births
Association football defenders
Democratic Republic of the Congo footballers
Footballers from Kinshasa
Democratic Republic of the Congo expatriate footballers
Expatriate footballers in France
Democratic Republic of the Congo expatriate sportspeople in France
Expatriate soccer players in Canada
Democratic Republic of the Congo expatriate sportspeople in Canada
Stade Lavallois players
Bergerac Périgord FC players
FC Edmonton players
Championnat National 3 players
Championnat National 2 players
Championnat National players
Ligue 2 players
Canadian Premier League players
Liga II players
ASC Oțelul Galați players